Pindad APS-1 or APS-1 (Angkut Personel Sedang-1; English: Medium Personnel Carrier) is an armored military vehicle made by PT Pindad (Persero), Indonesia. This vehicle is used to transport personnel or known by the name APC. This armored vehicle is a development of the prototype  APR-1V (Light Personnel Transport-1V) with 4×4 wheels drive by BPPT and Pindad then improved its capabilities by using 6×4 wheel drive.

The difference with the APR-1V prototype is the replacement of the chassis model from Isuzu to the  Perkasa truck chassis made by PT Texmaco. This nearly 11 tonne combat weight vehicle is powered by a diesel engine built into the Perkasa truck, namely the Steyr WD 612 with a cylinder capacity of 6,600 cc which produces 220 PS of power. The engine is paired with a manual transmission, 6 forward and 1 reverse. The maximum speed on flat road reaches 120 km / hour. APS-1 has been equipped with power steering and air conditioning (AC). The APS-1 has a ground clearance of 41 cm making it agile enough to cross bumpy roads (off-road) and a turning radius of 8 m. This armored vehicle is capable of running on a 60 degree incline and a 30 degree slope.

See also 
 VAB
 Pindad APR-1V
 Pindad APS-2
 Pindad APS-3 Anoa

References

External links 

 PT Pindad Panser 6x6 
 Army Technology
 Republika Online

Wheeled armoured personnel carriers
Post–Cold War military equipment of Indonesia
Six-wheeled vehicles
Military vehicles of Indonesia